Brian Michael O'Connor was the Dean of Auckland from 1997 to 2000.

O'Connor was born in 1942 and educated at St Catharine's College, Cambridge. He studied for the priesthood at Ripon College Cuddesdon and was ordained in 1969. His firstpost was a curacy in Headington. After this he was  Priest in charge at Merton, Oxfordshire then Vicar of Rainham, Kent (and also Rural Dean of Gillingham).

References

1942 births
Deans of Auckland
Alumni of St Catharine's College, Cambridge
Living people